The National Collections Centre, near Swindon, England, is the collections management facility for the Science Museum Group and the Science Museum Library & Archives.

Overview
The Science Museum originally took ownership of the 545-acre former RAF Wroughton airfield in 1979, to be used as a storage facility for the museum's largest objects. A collection of approximately 35,000 objects is currently stored in six of the hangars and a purpose-built store. These include the world's first hovercraft, MRI scanners, computers, (de-activated) nuclear missiles and much more. In 2007 the collection of the Science Museum Library and Archives was also relocated to new facilities at the site.

In 2016 the site started to be featured in The Grand Tour, a motoring entertainment show. The show's three ex 'Top Gear' hosts use some of the roads surrounding the museum buildings as a vehicle test track each week.

In 2018 the site was rebranded as the National Collections Centre to reflect the use of the facility by the Science Museum Group as its primary collections management facility. 

The 26,000m2 purpose-built facility was completed in 2021 which will eventually house and provide access to over 400,000 objects from the collection.

Functions

Collections management

The primary focus of the National Collections Centre is to conserve and manage the collections of the Science Museum Group. Over 35,000 large objects are currently housed at the site in the former aircraft hangars. 

The Science Museum Group, the British Museum and the Victoria and Albert Museum had previously used Blythe House in London as storage, but had to move out after the government announced its intention to sell the building. The Science Museum Group received £40m from the government to develop the National Collections Centre site and create a high-quality accessible facility for the management of the collection. In addition to storage, the building has conservation labs and research facilities.

The facility will open to public tours, school and research visits in 2023.

Some of the objects in the collection currently stored at the centre:

Douglas DC-3 aircraft
Ford Edsel motor car
Boeing 247 aircraft
de Havilland Comet 4B G-APYD, Hawker Siddeley HS-121 Trident 3B G-AWZM and Lockheed Constellation N7777G, the only Constellation preserved in the United Kingdom.
 A double-decker bus
 A TV detector van
 The world's first amphibious hovercraft
 Early 20th-century electric vehicles
The Wood Press, the last hot metal printing press in Fleet Street

Library and Archives
The Science Museum Library & Archives collections are part of the Science Museum in London. Its holdings include original scientific, technical and medical works from the last 500 years. Part of this collection is stored at the Dana Research Centre and Library in London and it's free to use and open to the public (currently open by pre-booked appointments only on Thu-Fri, 10.00-17.00).

The Science Museum Library was founded in 1883 as the Science Library of the South Kensington Museum. It was formed of collections from the South Kensington Educational Library and the library of the Museum of Practical Geology. In 1907 it moved to the Royal College of Science building. When the Science Museum gained its independence in 1909, the Science Library became its responsibility.

In 1992 the Library joined with Imperial College London to form the Imperial College & Science Museum Libraries. Due to the increasing demand for space in South Kensington, about 85% of the collections and all of the archives moved to a specially adapted library building at Wroughton in 2007. The library in London closed in February 2014 and all of its collections were moved to Wroughton.

The Library collections
The printed collections include rare books and first editions, journals from the 16th to the 20th centuries, Trade Literature, exhibition catalogues, British patents from 1617 to 1992 as well as over 85,000 books focussing on the history and social aspects of science, technology and medicine

The named archive collections include old original archives of some of the most famous and influential individuals and companies in the fields of science, medicine, engineering and industry. These include personal papers, photographs, glass plate negatives, company records, technical drawings and other original manuscripts from famous figures and organisations such as the engineering drawings of Charles Babbage and Barnes Wallis as well as papers relating to Donald Campbell and Hooper's car-building firm.

The MS archives are smaller collections of well over two thousand items, ranging in size from single items such as letters and notebooks to small collections comprising a number of items, which provide snapshots of the lives of those who created them. The material provides a wide-ranging source of subject information across the science, design and technology disciplines, as well as insights into the day-to-day lives of individuals and families

Amongst the library and archives holdings are:
 Charles Babbage's notebooks, engineering plans, certificates, social diary and letters.
 Barnes Wallis’s plans for the bouncing bomb.
 Pearson PLC engineering papers and photographs.
 Walt Patterson nuclear collection.
 Humphry Davy's letters. 
 George Parker Bidder's papers. 
The New Cyclopaedia, or, Universal Dictionary of the Arts and Sciences. (Rees's Cyclopædia)

Sustainability 
In April 2021 the Science Museum Group announced that it is targeting to achieve overall Net Zero / Carbon Neutrality by 2033. The National Collections Centre site hosts one of the UK's largest solar farms, completed in 2016, which is capable of generating close to 50GW of energy per year, four times more than that consumed by the Science Museum Group as a whole.

Other activities at the site
The National Collections centre is regularly used for research and development, films and television, storage for other culture sector partners and testing of equipment for new technology and energy projects.

Inserts for the television series, The Grand Tour were filmed on the streets surrounding the museum from 2016 to 2019.

See also
 List of museums in Wiltshire

References

External links

Science Museum Group Archive catalogue
Science Museum Library catalogue

1979 establishments in England
Museums established in 1979
Wroughton
Wroughton
Industry museums in England
Science museums in England
Museums in Wiltshire
Libraries in Wiltshire
Archives in Wiltshire
Science Museum Group